Kent D. Shelhamer is an American politician who was a former Democratic member of the Pennsylvania House of Representatives.

References

1924 births
Living people
Democratic Party members of the Pennsylvania House of Representatives